Adrián Slávik (born 12 April 1999) is a Slovak professional footballer who plays as a defender for Dukla Banská Bystrica.

Club career

AS Trenčín
Slávik made his Fortuna Liga debut for AS Trenčín against Žilina on 27 May 2018 during a 2-1 away victory, coming on as a second-half replacement for Trinidadian international Keston Julien.

References

External links
 AS Trenčín official profile 
 Futbalnet profile 
 
 

 

1999 births
Living people
Sportspeople from Považská Bystrica
Slovak footballers
Slovakia youth international footballers
Association football defenders
AS Trenčín players
FK Dubnica players
MFK Dukla Banská Bystrica players
Slovak Super Liga players
2. Liga (Slovakia) players